Yum Yum is an unincorporated community in Fayette County, Tennessee, United States, just 7 miles north of the town of Somerville.

History 
The community derives its name from a 19th-century brand of candy. Local tradition states that the community was named when U.S. Senator Kenneth McKellar asked storekeeper John J. Garnett what to name the new post office and Garnett answered, "Just call it Yum Yum. There won't be another name like that."

References

Unincorporated communities in Fayette County, Tennessee
Unincorporated communities in Tennessee